The year 1938 in archaeology involved some significant events.

Explorations
 Matthew Stirling first visits the Tres Zapotes and San Lorenzo Tenochtitlán sites.

Excavations
 The Iron Age farmstead site at Little Woodbury, Wiltshire, England, by Gerhard Bersu for the Prehistoric Society using open area excavation techniques (continues to 1939; published 1940).
 Llantwit Major Roman Villa in Wales, by V. E. Nash-Williams (continues to 1948).
 The Neolithic settlement of Rinyo on Rousay in Orkney (Scotland), by V. Gordon Childe (resumed 1946).

Publications
 T. D. Kendrick - Anglo-Saxon Art to A.D. 900.
 Wilhelm König - "Ein Galvanisches Element aus der Partherzeit?". Forschungen und Fortschritte 14:8–9 (on the "Baghdad Battery").

Finds
 June - TM 1517, first remains of Paranthropus robustus, from Kromdraai fossil site in South Africa.
 Maya site of Caracol is rediscovered.
 Luther Cressman, the first to explore the region, discovers preserved 9,000-year-old shredded sage sandals at Fort Rock Cave in south central Oregon, USA. Until radiocarbon dating verifies his find, his belief has been that humans had occupied the area a maximum of 4,000 years ago.
 'Barber surgeon of Avebury'.
 Bronze Head from Ife.

Births
 March 8 - Lamia Al-Gailani Werr, Iraqi archaeologist (died 2019)
 October 4 - Gennady Zdanovich, Russian archaeologist (died 2020)
 Anthony Aveni, American anthropologist

Deaths
 February 24 - Thomas Gann, British explorer and archaeologist (born 1867)
 August 9 - Leo Frobenius, German ethnologist (born 1873)

References

Archaeology
Archaeology
Archaeology by year